Eduardo de Zulueta y Dato (4 December 1923 – 28 July 2020) was a Spanish diplomat.

Born in Paris, son of Ernesto de Zulueta e Isasi, (1892–1969) and María de la Concepción Dato y Barrenechea, of the Dukes of Dato, (1890–1973).

He died in July 2020 at the age of 96.

Career
He was a Licentiate in Law and a Diplomat. He was Ambassador of Spain in Luxembourg and Algeria, Permanent Observer Ambassador of Spain to the Organization of American States in Washington, D.C., Director-General of Ecclesiastical Affairs at the Ministry of Justice, Chief of Protocol of the International Exposition of Seville, Director of International Affairs of the Instituto Cervantes, etc., and was created Grand Cross of the Order of St. Raymond of Peñafort and the Order of St. Sylvester of the Holy See, Commander of the Order of Civil Merit of Spain and the Order of Isabel the Catholic and Knight of the Order of Charles III.

References

1923 births
2020 deaths
Spanish diplomats
Spanish untitled nobility
Spanish expatriates in France
Spanish expatriates in Luxembourg
Spanish expatriates in Algeria
Spanish expatriates in the United States